American rock band Journey has released 15 studio albums, five live albums, 11 compilation albums, and 51 singles since 1975.

Albums

Studio albums

Live albums

Compilation albums

Soundtracks

Album statistics

Extended plays

Singles

Notes

Billboard and "Cash Box" Year-End  Performances

Notes:

Soundtrack appearances

Videography

Video albums

Music videos

References

Discographies of American artists
Rock music group discographies
Discography